The following is a notable list of energy drinks, with a few coffee variants, and some soft drinks such as Coca-Cola, Mountain Dew, and Pepsi listed for comparison, and marked in a different color. The caffeine content in coffee and tea varies, depending on how the coffee beans were roasted, among other factors.

Energy drinks

Comparison with other beverages

Unsorted
 Boost Drinks
 Revo
 Rich Energy

References 

 
Energy drinks